University Hall is the first and oldest building on the campus of Brown University in Providence, Rhode Island. Built in 1770, the building is one of only seven extant college buildings built prior to the American Revolution. According to architectural historian Bryant F. Tolles Jr., the structure is "one of the genuine icons of early American collegiate architecture."

The building occupies a central part of the university's front campus and is framed by the Van Wickle Gates.

History

Construction 
Built in 1770, University Hall was originally known as the College Edifice. The building was constructed on a piece of land that had belonged to the original Brown family ancestor and co-founder of Providence, Chad Brown (c. 1600–1650).

The first reference to the building was made on September 5, 1765, at the second meeting of the Corporation in Newport. Later meetings of the Corporation organized a building committee; among the committee's members were Stephen Hopkins and Joseph Brown. The plans were finalized on February 9, 1770, and on February 17 the building committee placed a notice in the Providence Gazette soliciting donations of timber and other materials. At the time of its construction until the construction of the First Baptist Church in 1775, University Hall was the largest building in Rhode Island.

Prominent Newport merchant and slave trader Aaron Lopez donated timber to the effort, while Nicholas Brown, Sr. and Company led the construction. The workforce involved in the construction of the building was diverse, reflecting the ethnic and social admixture of colonial Providence's population. Slaves, free people of color, indigenous people, and white laborers—both skilled and unskilled—worked to erect the structure.

Construction on the building began on March 26, 1770, and the roof of the structure was raised on October 13, 1770. Construction on the building resumed following the Revolutionary War, continuing into the 1790s.

Morgan Edwards, described the location as "Commanding a prospect of ... an extensive country, variegated with hills and dales, woods, and plains," and was further inspired to write, "Surely, this spot was made for a seat for the Muses."

American Revolution 
During the presidency of the Reverend Manning, the building was used to house French and other revolutionary troops led by General George Washington and the Comte de Rochambeau during the wait to commence the celebrated march of 1781 that led to the Siege of Yorktown and the Battle of the Chesapeake.

Following the departure of the French troops, President Manning petitioned the Rhode Island General Assembly as follows:

19th Century 
The name of the building was changed from the College Edifice to University Hall in 1823 following the construction of Brown's second building, Hope College. In 1834, following the construction of neighboring Manning Hall, the exterior of University Hall was coated with cement. At this time, the original wooden balustrade was removed from the roof.  In 1843, the structure was again turned over to the military for use in suppressing the Dorr Rebellion. In 1883, a large renovation of the building's interior was undertaken by Gould & Angell, including the introduction of steam hating and gas lighting.

20th Century 

The building was further renovated in 1905 following a donation by Providence resident Marsden J. Perry. This effort involved the removal of the plaster that had been applied to the building's exterior in the 1830s (mirroring the adjacent Manning Hall) as well as the restoration of the belfry and windows. 

On May 11, 1927, a tablet placed on University Hall was dedicated to the memory of General Nathanael Greene, who had received an honorary degree from Brown in 1776, by the First Light Infantry Regiment of Rhode Island.

Renovations took place once again in 1939. Led by Perry, Shaw & Hepburn, this renovation saw the replacement of the building's foundation and the restoration of the building's chimneys and cupola. At the rededication of University Hall on May 4, 1940, French ambassador Comte René Doynel de Saint-Quentin and Princeton president Harold W. Dodds took part in the ceremonies recalling the university's early associations with France and Princeton.

The building has been used for many different purposes at the university over the years. It currently houses the office for the president of Brown on the first floor, facing the middle campus in space first occupied by the Commons, along with other administrative offices.

The building was designated a National Historic Landmark in 1962, recognizing it as an excellent example of 18th-century academic architecture, and as key place in the life of educator Horace Mann (1796–1859), who graduated from Brown in 1819 and taught there until 1821, before embarking on a career of educational reform.

Architecture 

University Hall is a four-story, seventeen bay structure. The building's largely rectangular form measures approximately 150 long and 46 feet wide. The central three bays of the building project an additional ten feet forward, forming pedimented pavilions measuring 33 feet across. The structure's hipped roof is decorated with an ornamental balustrade and features a central cupola.

Designed in the late Georgian style, the building is constructed of red brick and decorated with white-painted, wood trim. The facade of the structure is relatively unornamented with the exception of plain brick belt courses which mark the building's stories. Brick segmental arches frame the structure's evenly spaced, double sash windows. T

Compared to coeval academic buildings, University Hall is of modest and utilitarian character. Speaking of the building's design, architectural historian Henry-Russell Hitchcock wrote "academic design could hardly be further reduced to its essentials of solid mass, sound proportions and regular rhythm." The building is notable for its projecting pediment bays on the west and east side, which was influenced by Renaissance ideas of buildings with clear focal points and vistas.

Architect 
There is some ambiguity surrounding the architect of University Hall. Historical sources have attributed the structure to a variety of architects, including Joseph Brown, Robert Smith, and Joseph Horatio Anderson.

Joseph Brown is most frequently posited as the chief architect of the structure. While Brown was clearly involved in the design process, historian Lawrence C. Wroth disputes sources attributing the structure solely to the amateur architect. According to Wroth, "an architectural commission and not Joseph Brown alone was responsible for the choice of a design."

Architectural historian Bryant F. Tolles Jr. notes that Philadelphia architect Robert Smith may have visited Providence during the building's planning and contributed to its design.

In a letter dated March 14, 1770, architect Joseph Horatio Anderson offered his services to the new college. The correspondence, however, was received only after construction on the building had begun.

Nassau Hall, built 14 years prior at the College of New Jersey, is often cited as the model for the building. James Manning, Brown's first president and active member of the building process, was educated at Princeton and may have suggested that Brown's first building resemble that of his alma mater.

Gallery

See also 

List of National Historic Landmarks in Rhode Island
National Register of Historic Places listings in Providence, Rhode Island
List of historic sites preserved along Rochambeau's route
Nassau Hall

References

Notes

School buildings completed in 1770
Brown University buildings
National Historic Landmarks in Rhode Island
University and college buildings on the National Register of Historic Places in Rhode Island
National Register of Historic Places in Providence, Rhode Island
Historic places on the Washington–Rochambeau Revolutionary Route
Historic American Buildings Survey in Rhode Island
Historic district contributing properties in Rhode Island
1770 establishments in Rhode Island